Auman is a surname. Notable people with the surname include:

Dorothy Auman (died 1991), American potter
Joseph M. Auman (1922–1942), American soldier
William Auman (1838–1920), American general

See also
 Aumann